Cycas sainathii is a species of Cycad in India. Its type locality is Shibpur, Howrah district, West Bengal.

References

sainathii